Kendriya Vidyalaya Rourkela (Hindi for Central School) is a system of central government schools under the Ministry of Human Resource Development (India). It is in the steel city of Rourkela. The system came into being in 1982 under the name "Central Schools" and has been affiliated with CBSE.

History 
The school initially started with class from one to five, but later on it grew with class 10. Now the school has classes up to class 12.

Academics and facilities 

The school has over 650 students from class I to XII, having with science at Senior Secondary level.

It prepares the students of Class X and XII for CBSE examinations AISSE and AISSCE.

The school has a Primary Resource Room, Art and Craft room, Audio Visual Aid room, Science Laboratories, Computer rooms with LCD and OHP facilities, playgrounds, gardens and a library.

Co-curricular activities 
Students participate in activities that enhances their skill in the field of education. They participate in English Debate, English Poem Recitation, English Elocution/Creative English, and many more.

Learning aids 
The school has a library of over 3,000 books. It subscribes to over 30 magazines and periodicals of educational and literary nature.

Kendriya Vidyalaya provides computer education from Class I to Class XII. The school has two computer laboratories with a total of 39 computers.

Internet access is available to the students in the library and the computer laboratory.

The approved staff strength is 60 with 31 teachers.

See also
 List of Kendriya Vidyalayas

References

External links
 official website kvrkl.org

 
Primary schools in India
High schools and secondary schools in Odisha
Schools in Rourkela
Sector 06 Rourkela
Educational institutions established in 1982
1982 establishments in Orissa